Neil Adam may refer to:

Neil Kensington Adam (1891–1973), British chemist
Neil Adam, musician in the band Silly Wizard 
Neil Adam (racehorse trainer), British racehorse trainer

See also
Neil Adams (disambiguation)